Fort Scammon, also known as Camp White or Fort Hill, is an archaeological site in Charleston in Kanawha County, West Virginia. The site preserves earthenwork battlements that were set up in 1863 in an elliptical pattern.  The period of significance during the American Civil War coincides with the period of late summer in 1862 when Confederate artillery fired from the area and the year or so after March 1863 when Union troops fortified the heights.

Located atop a prominence known today as "Fort Hill", it was listed on the National Register of Historic Places in 1976.

References

External links
 National Register of Historic Places Inventory Nomination Form

Scammon
American Civil War on the National Register of Historic Places
Archaeological sites on the National Register of Historic Places in West Virginia
Government buildings completed in 1863
Infrastructure completed in 1863
Buildings and structures in Charleston, West Virginia
Forts in Kanawha County, West Virginia
Kanawha County, West Virginia in the American Civil War
National Register of Historic Places in Charleston, West Virginia
Scammon